Savage Creek may refer to:

Savage Creek (Ocmulgee River tributary), a stream in Georgia
Savage Creek (Rogue River tributary), a stream in Oregon
Savage Creek (Tennessee), a stream in Tennessee